Boris Alexandrovich Tchaikovsky (10 September 1925 – 7 February 1996), PAU, was a Soviet and Russian composer, born in Moscow, whose oeuvre includes orchestral works, chamber music and film music. He is considered as part of the second generation of Russian composers, following in the steps of Pyotr Tchaikovsky (to whom he was not related) and especially Mussorgsky.

He was admired by Dmitri Shostakovich, with whom he studied, who (according to Per Skans in his notes for a recording) suggested in a letter of 1 February 1969 to Isaak Glikman, that "If Barshai's orchestra (the Moscow chamber orchestra) makes a guest appearance in Leningrad playing Vainberg's Tenth Symphony and Boris Tchaikovsky's Sinfonietta, you really have to hear them".

Of his larger-scale works almost all have been recorded. Boris Tchaikovsky generally wrote in a tonal style, although he made brief forays into serialism.

Selected works
Stage
 The Star (Звезда), unfinished opera in three scenes (1949); libretto by David Samoilov after the novel by Emmanuil Kazakevich; Moscow Conservatory diploma-work

 Orchestral
 Procession (Шествие) (1946)
 Symphony No.1 (1947)
 Fantasia on Russian Folk Themes (Фантазия на русские народные темы) (1950)
 Slavic Rhapsody (Славянская рапсодия) (1951)
 Symphonietta for string orchestra (1953)
 The Murmuring Forest Orchestral Suite (1953)
 Capriccio on English Themes (Каприччио на английские темы) (1954)
 Overture (Увертюра) (1957)
 Symphony No.2 (1967)
 Chamber Symphony (Камерная симфония) for chamber orchestra (1967)
 Theme and Eight Variations (Тема и восемь вариаций) (1973)
 Six Etudes (Шесть этюдов) for string orchestra and organ (1976)
 Symphony No.3 "Sevastopol" (Севастопольская симфония) (1980)
 The Winds of Siberia (Ветер Сибири), Symphonic Poem (1984)
 Four Preludes (Четыре прелюдии) for chamber orchestra (1984)
 The Juvenile (Подросток), Poem for orchestra (1984)
 Music for Orchestra (Музыка для оркестра) (1987)
 Symphony with Harp (Симфония с арфой) (1993)
 The Bells (Колокола), Prelude for orchestra (1996; completed in short score only)

 Concertos
 Concerto for clarinet and chamber orchestra (1957)
 Concerto for cello and orchestra (1964)
 Concerto for violin and orchestra (1969)
 Concerto for piano and orchestra (1971)

 Chamber music
 Piano Trio (1953)
 String Quartet No.1 (1954)
 String Trio (1955)
 Sonata for cello and piano (1957)
 Sonata for violin and piano (1959)
 Suite in D minor for cello solo (1960)
 String Quartet No.2 (1961)
 Piano Quintet (1962)
 Partita for cello and chamber ensemble (1966)
 String Quartet No.3 (1967)
 String Quartet No.4 (1972)
 String Quartet No.5 (1974)
 String Quartet No.6 (1976)
 Sextet for wind quintet and harp (1990)

Piano
 3 Etudes (1935; 1972; 1980)
 5 Pieces (1935) 
 5 Preludes (1936)
 5 Pieces (1938)
 Sonata No.1 (1944)
 2 Pieces (1945)
 Sonatina (1946)
 Sonata No.2 (1952)
 8 Children's Pieces (Восемь детских пьес) (1952)
 Sonata for two pianos (1973)
 Pentatonic (Пентатоника), 6 Easy Pieces (1993)
 Natural Modes (Натуральные лады), 7 Miniatures (1993)

Vocal
 Two Poems by Mikhail Lermontov (Два стихотворения М. Ю. Лермонтова) for soprano and piano (1940)
 Four Poems by Josef Brodsky (Четыре стихотворения И. Бродского) for soprano and piano (1965) 
 Lyrics of Pushkin (Лирика Пушкина), Song Cycle for soprano and piano (1972)
 Signs of the Zodiac (Знаки Зодиака), Cantata for soprano, harpsichord and string orchestra (1974)
 The Last Spring (Последняя весна), Song Cycle for mezzo-soprano, flute, clarinet and piano (1980); words by N. Zabolotsky
 From Kipling (Из Киплинга) for mezzo-soprano and viola (1994)

Film scores

References

Literature

External links
The Boris Tchaikovsky Society
Onno van Rijen's Boris Tchaikovsky page — brief biographical information and list of works with discography

Boris Tchaikovsky at the Russian film database Kino-Teatr 
US Premiere of Music for Orchestra (1987) on February 24, 2010 by the American Symphony Orchestra

1925 births
1996 deaths
20th-century classical musicians
20th-century composers
20th-century Russian male musicians
Male film score composers
Russian composers
Russian male composers
Soviet film score composers
Soviet male classical composers